Pentanoyl chloride is an acyl chloride derived from pentanoic acid. It is a colorless liquid that is used to attach the valeroyl group.  It is usually produced by chlorination of valeric acid.

Reactions
Like related acyl chlorides, valeryl chloride hydrolyzes readily:
CH3(CH2)3C(O)Cl  +  H2O  →  CH3(CH2)3CO2H  +  HCl
Alcohols react to give esters:
CH3(CH2)3C(O)Cl  +  ROH  →  CH3(CH2)3CO2R  +  HCl
Amines react to give amides:
CH3(CH2)3C(O)Cl  +  R2NH  →  CH3(CH2)3C(O)NR2  +  HCl
Benzene reacts under conditions of the Friedel-Crafts reaction to give valerophenone:
CH3(CH2)3C(O)Cl  +  C6H6  →  CH3(CH2)3C(O)C6H5  +  HCl

References

Acyl chlorides
Reagents for organic chemistry